The 1965 Howard Bulldogs football team represented Howard College (now Samford University) as an independent during the 1965 NCAA College Division football season. Led by head coach Bubba Scott Howard played their home games at Seibert Stadium.

Schedule

References

Howard
Samford Bulldogs football seasons
Howard Bulldogs football